Forbes's forest rail (Rallicula forbesi) or Forbes's forest crake, is a species of bird in the family Sarothruridae.
It is found in New Guinea.
Its natural habitats are subtropical or tropical moist lowland forest and subtropical or tropical moist montane forest.

References

External links
Image at ADW 

Rallicula
Birds described in 1887
Taxonomy articles created by Polbot